Cintāmaṇi (Sanskrit; Devanagari: चिंतामणि; Chinese: 如意寶珠; Pinyin: Rúyì bǎozhū; Japanese Romaji: Nyoihōju; Tamil:சிந்தாமணி), also spelled as Chintamani (or the Chintamani Stone), is a wish-fulfilling jewel within both Hindu and Buddhist traditions, said by some to be the equivalent of the philosopher's stone in Western alchemy. It is one of several Mani Jewel images found in Buddhist scripture.

Within Hinduism, it is connected with the gods Vishnu and Ganesha. In Hindu tradition, it is often depicted as a fabulous jewel in the possession of Vishnu as the Kaustubha Mani or as on the forehead of the Naga king called as Naga Mani, or on the forehead of the Makara. The Yoga Vasistha, originally written in the 10th century CE, contains a story about the cintamani.
The Hindu Vishnu Purana speaks of the "Syamanta jewel, bestowing prosperity upon its owner, encapsulates the Yadu clan system". The Vishnu Purana is attributed to the mid-first millennium CE.

In Buddhism, it is held by the Bodhisattvas (divine beings with great compassion, wisdom and power) Avalokiteshvara and Ksitigarbha. It is also seen carried upon the back of the Lung Ta (wind horse) which is depicted on Tibetan prayer flags. By reciting the Dharani (small hymn) of Cintamani, Buddhist tradition maintains that one attains the Wisdom of Buddha, able to understand the truth of the Buddha, and turn afflictions into Bodhi. It is said to allow one to see the Holy Retinue of Amitabha and assembly upon one's deathbed.  In Tibetan Buddhist tradition the Chintamani is sometimes depicted as a luminous pearl and is in the possession of several of different forms of the Buddha.

In Japan, where the Hindu goddess Lakshmi is known as Kisshōten in Shinto, she is commonly depicted with a Cintāmaṇi in her hand.

Etymology
Cintāmaṇi (Sanskrit; Devanagari: चिन्तामणि): 'Wish-Fulfilling Gem' The mani (jewel) is translated in Chinese ruyi or ruyizhu 如意珠 "as-one-wishes jewel" or ruyibaozhu 如意寶珠 "as-one-wishes precious jewel". Ruyibaozhu is pronounced in Japanese nyoi-hōju or nyoi-hōshu 如意宝珠. Ruyizhu is pronounced in Korean yeouiju 여의주.

Hinduism 
The Brihad Bhagavatamrita compares this gem with devotion towards Vishnu:

The Bhagavata Purana remarks that the cintamani may give worldly pleasures and affluence in Svarga, but spiritual advancement allows one to attain Vaikuntha, the realm of Vishnu that is difficult to achieve, even for yogins.

Buddhism

In Buddhism the Chintamani is said to be one of four relics that came in a chest that fell from the sky (many terma fell from the sky in caskets) during the reign of king Lha Thothori Nyantsen of Tibet. Though the king did not understand the purpose of the objects, he kept them in a position of reverence. Several years later, two mysterious strangers appeared at the court of the king, explaining the four relics, which included the Buddha's bowl (possibly a Singing Bowl) and a mani stone with the Om Mani Padme Hum mantra inscribed on it. These few objects were the bringers of the Dharma to Tibet.

The Digital Dictionary of Buddhism's ruyizhu entry says:A -jewel; magical jewel, which manifests whatever one wishes for (Skt. ,). According to one's desires, treasures, clothing and food can be manifested, while sickness and suffering can be removed, water can be purified, etc. It is a metaphor for the teachings and virtues of the Buddha. ... Said to be obtained from the dragon-king of the sea, or the head of the great fish, Makara, or the relics of a Buddha.

The Kintamani mountainous region in Bali was named after the Cintamani.

See also
 List of mythological objects
 Śarīra
 Mani stone
 Ashtamangala
 Yasakani no Magatama
 Kaustubha Gem
 Kisshoutennyo (吉祥天女)
 Kagome crest - A 6-pointed star and a 8-pointed star; a symbol also associated with the goddess Lakshmi/Kisshōtennyo.  
 Luminous gemstones
 Philosopher's stone
 Cornucopia
 Sampo
 Holy Grail
 Holy Chalice
 Sendai Daikannon statue
 Syamantaka Gem
 Eight Treasures
 Tide jewels

Notes

Bibliography
 Beer, Robert (1999). The Encyclopedia of Tibetan Symbols and Motifs (Hardcover).  Shambhala.  , 
 

Objects in Hindu mythology
Buddhist mythology
Tibetan Buddhist mythology
Mythological substances
Sanskrit words and phrases
Fictional gemstones and jewelry
Magic items